Sonpur and Bazari are two villages that have lent their name to the Sonpur-Bazari open cast coal mines project in the Pandabeswar CD block in the Durgapur subdivision of the Paschim Bardhaman district in the state of West Bengal, India.

Geography

Demographics
According to the 2011 Census of India, Sonpur had a total population of 2,358, of which 1,187 (50%) were males and 1,171 (50%) were females. Population in the age range 0-6 years was 272. The total number of literate persons in Sonpur was 1,400 (67.11% of the population over 6 years).

According to the 2011 Census of India, Bazari had a total population of 1,583, of which 797 (50%) were males and 786 (50%) were females. Population in the age range 0-6 years was 204. The total number of literate persons in Bazari was 947 (68.67% of the population over 6 years).bazari

*For language details see Pandabeswar (community development block)#Language and religion

Economy

Open Cast Project
Sonpur Bazari Open Cast Project of Eastern Coalfields was approved in 1995. The targeted output in 2016-17 was 8 million tonnes. Mineable reserve as on 1/4/2015 was 179.60 million tonnes. Balance life of the project as on 1/4/2012 was 23 years.

Sonpur Bazari Area
Sonpur Bazari OCP is the only colliery in the Sonepur Bazari Area of ECL.

See also - Pandaveswar Area#Mining plan - it includes Sonpur Bazari

Transport
National Highway 14 (old number NH 60) passes in between the Sonpur and Bazari villages and near the OCP.

The nearest railway station is at Pandabeswar.

Healthcare
Medical facilities (dispensary) in the Sonpur Bazari Area of ECL are available at Sonpur Bazari (PO Bahula).

References

Villages in Paschim Bardhaman district
Coal mining operational areas in West Bengal